The 44th Golden Globe Awards, honoring the best in film and television for 1986, were held on 31 January 1987 at the Beverly Hilton.

Winners and nominees

Film 

The following films received multiple nominations:

The following films received multiple wins:

Television

The following programs received multiple nominations:

The following programs received multiple wins:

Ceremony

Presenters 

 David Anspaugh
 Stephanie Beacham
 Heidi Bohay
 Bruce Boxleitner
 James Brolin
 Diahann Carroll
 Tony Curtis
 John Daly
 Olivia de Havilland
 Rebecca De Mornay
 Carter DeHaven
 Derek Gibson
 Whoopi Goldberg
 Steve Guttenberg
 George Hamilton
 Charlton Heston
 Dennis Hopper
 Stacy Keach
 John Larroquette
 Heather Locklear
 Melissa Manchester
 Marsha Mason
 Bill Medley
 Donna Mills
 Melba Moore
 Pat Morita
 Gary Morris
 Angelo Pizzo
 Tom Selleck
 Jane Seymour
 Jaclyn Smith
 Toni Tennille
 Joan Van Ark
 Jon Voight
 Robert Wagner
 Lesley Ann Warren

Cecil B. DeMille Award 
Anthony Quinn

Awards breakdown 
The following networks received multiple nominations:

The following networks received multiple wins:

See also
59th Academy Awards
7th Golden Raspberry Awards
38th Primetime Emmy Awards
39th Primetime Emmy Awards
 40th British Academy Film Awards
 41st Tony Awards
 1986 in film
 1986 in American television

References

044
1986 film awards
1986 television awards
January 1987 events in the United States
1986 awards in the United States